National Small Business Week is a national recognition event to honor the United States' top entrepreneurs each year.  The distinguished group of small business owners are hailed each year by the U.S. Small Business Administration and a collection of event co-hosts.  The 2013 event marks the 60th anniversary of the agency, and the 50th annual Presidential proclamation of National Small Business Week.

Honors
Annual honors include:

The National Small Business Person of the Year, selected from the 54 State Small Business Persons of the Year. The Phoenix Awards, recognizing a public official, a business owner and a volunteer whose efforts have helped their businesses or communities recover successfully from a disaster.
The Lender of the Year, honoring financial institutions, including those that provide financing for small business exporters and inner city businesses.
The Entrepreneurial Development Awards, honoring Small Business Development Centers, Women's Business Centers and SCORE for their innovation and excellence in assistance to entrepreneurs and small businesses.
The Dwight D. Eisenhower Award for Excellence, recognizing large prime contractors who have excelled in their utilization of small businesses as suppliers and subcontractors.
The Small Business Prime Contractor and Small Business Subcontractor of the Year, honoring small businesses that have provided government and industry with outstanding goods and services as prime or sub contractors.

Small business owners from across the country will be honored for their accomplishments as the nation's leading small businesses, culminating in the announcement of the National Small Business Person of the Year. 

On the final day of National Small Business Week, State Small Business Person of the Year winners from across the country meet in Washington, D.C. to see which of them will be named National Small Business Person of the Year. The National Small Business Person of the Year and runners-up will be selected from among the 54 state small business winners, including the District of Columbia, Puerto Rico, the U.S. Virgin Islands, and Guam. Small businesses being honored in 2013 reflect a wide range of businesses, from high-tech startups and communications firms, to a printing company and a helicopter pilot school.

In addition to the State Small Business Persons of the Year, men and women involved in disaster recovery, government procurement, small business champions, and SBA partners in financial and entrepreneurial development will be honored. 

The small business community nationwide can take part in Small Business Week by participating in Google+ hangouts and watching selected programming of the week's events via live stream at www.SBA.gov/NSBW. The site includes information on small business honorees, event co-sponsors, schedule of events and press materials.

More information about the U.S. Small Business Administration can be found online at http://www.SBA.gov.

Links:
National Small Business Week Website: http://www.sba.gov/nsbw
SBA Website: http://www.SBA.gov

Entrepreneurship organizations
Awareness weeks in the United States 
April observances 
May observances